Alfonso de Santa Cruz (1632 - 25 Sep 1698) was a Roman Catholic prelate who served as Auxiliary Bishop of Toledo (1683–1698).

Biography
Alfonso de Santa Cruz was born in 1632.  On 15 Feb 1683, he was appointed during the papacy of Pope Innocent XI as Auxiliary Bishop of Toledo and Titular Bishop of Methone. He served as Auxiliary Bishop of Toledo until his death on 25 Sep 1698. While bishop, he was the principal consecrator of Anselmo Gómez de la Torre, Bishop of Tui (1690), and Francisco Calderón de la Barca Nieto, Bishop of Salamanca (1693).

References 

1632 births
1698 deaths
17th-century Roman Catholic bishops in Spain
Bishops appointed by Pope Innocent XI